Aviva India is an Indian life assurance company, and a joint venture between Aviva plc, a British assurance company, and Dabur Group, an Indian conglomerate. Aviva began operations in July 2002 as a joint venture with Dabur Group, one of India’s oldest business houses. As per the Indian insurance sector regulations, Aviva plc has a 49% stake and Dabur has a 51% stake in the JV partnership.

Operations
Aviva has been focusing on the Online Platform in recent years, and several products, including Aviva i-Life, Aviva Health Secure, and Aviva i-Shield. This is in line with the company’s strategy to focus on newer formats and products that are easier for customers to understand and buy.

Corporate social responsibility
Aviva India conducts the Aviva Great Wall of Education in various cities each year, which collects books for underprivileged children. Over the last three years, the Aviva Great Wall of Education has collected more than 2 million books, which have been given to more than 500,000 underprivileged children across the country. The Aviva Great Wall of Education collected over 1.1 million books in 2011 alone. The Aviva Great Wall of Education was also listed in the Limca Book of Records for being the ‘largest wall of books’ for its debut year. It has received multiple awards, including the Bronze award at the inaugural CRY (Child Rights and You) Child Rights Champion Award, 'Highly Commended Award' at the TVE Corporate Sustainability Awards given at BAFTA, London, Gold at Spikes Asia 2010, a Bronze at Effies 2010 and a Silver at the Effies in 2011. It also won an Indy’s award in the ‘Community and Social Welfare’ category in 2011 and was awarded the ‘Out of the box PR idea’ award at India PR & Corporate Communications Awards in 2012.

References

External links
 

Aviva
Financial services companies established in 2002
Life insurance companies of India
Companies based in Gurgaon
Indian companies established in 2002
2002 establishments in Haryana
Dabur Group